The Sistema de Radiodifusoras Culturales Indígenas (SRCI) is a state-owned network of radio stations in Mexico. The radio stations it operates are community radio stations that aim to serve different sectors of the country's indigenous peoples. Pursuant to Article 4 of the Constitution, their mission is to strengthen the multicultural nature of the nation by promoting the use of 31 indigenous languages.

As the stations are owned by the federal government, they hold public concessions.

History 
The SRCI began operations in 1979 with the launch of XEZV-AM, "La Voz de la Montaña", in Tlapa de Comonfort, Guerrero. The network was initially managed by the National Indigenist Institute (INI), an agency of the federal government In 2003, the INI was dissolved and replaced by the National Commission for the Development of Indigenous Peoples (CDI), which consequently assumed control over the network. The CDI was in turn replaced by the National Institute of Indigenous Peoples (INPI) in late 2018.

Until 2019, the station was known as the Sistema de Radiodifusoras Culturales Indigenistas (Indigenist Cultural Broadcasting System).

Stations 

The SRCI operates 22 primary radio stations, most of which transmit on AM and eight of which are high-power FM stations. It also previously operated four 10-watt FM stations in Yucatán.

The 22 main stations transmit for an average of 12 hours a day, during daylight hours, covering 928 municipalities with high levels of indigenous inhabitants. The stations' potential audience comprises 5 million speakers of indigenous languages and more than 22 million Spanish speakers. They all broadcast an array of programming in both Spanish and the particular native languages spoken in the coverage area.

Four stations are AM-FM migrants: XHCARH, XHPET, XHTUMI, XHNKA. XHCARH and XHPET are required to maintain their AM frequencies because they are the only radio service for certain communities in its AM coverage area. The second and third stations reacquired their AM frequencies under new callsigns.

In 2016 and 2017, the CDI applied for and received FM radio stations that provide simulcast service for XETLA (XHPBSD-FM 95.9), XEGLO (XHGJO-FM 88.3), and XEQIN (XHSQB-FM 95.1).

On February 28, 2020, the INPI relaunched La Voz de los Chontales, which had been shuttered as XENAC in 1989 for political reasons, as XHCPBS-FM.

Defunct stations

Between 1982 and 1989, the SRCI system included a station at Nacajuca, Tabasco, XENAC-AM 1440. That station was shut down in 1989; the station was revived more than 30 years later as XHCPBS-FM.

The CDI also formerly held a trio of permits for low-power FM stations at three communities in Michoacán; these were not renewed.

Programming
The stations' programming is eminently community-focused. Bilingual presenters attend inquiries from listeners, convey community and personal announcements, and promote various government assistance programs in the areas of health, education, human rights, etc. Traditional music is also a key component of the stations' broadcasts, and their recording collections, frequently gathered in the field, constitute an important cultural resource.

References

External links 
 Sistema de Radiodifusoras Culturales Indígenas
 The Negotiation of Indigenist Radio Policy in Mexico (on World Association of Community Radio Broadcasters website)

 
Mexican radio networks
Indigenous peoples in Mexico
Government of Mexico
Community radio organizations
Indigenous mass media